Nijolė is a Lithuanian feminine given name. Individuals bearing the name Nijolė include:
Nijolė Ambrazaitytė (1939–2016), Lithuanian opera singer and politician
Nijolė Būraitė (born 1956), Lithuanian painter and painting restorer
Nijolė Medvedeva (born 1960), Lithuanian long jumper 
Nijolė Oželytė-Vaitiekūnienė (born 1954), Lithuanian actress 
Nijolė Sabaitė (born 1950), Lithuanian middle distance runner 
Nijolė Sadūnaitė (born 1938), Lithuanian Catholic nun and Soviet dissident

References 

Lithuanian feminine given names
Feminine given names